A rhythmic spring (also: ebb and flow spring, periodic spring, intermittent spring) is a cold water spring from which the flow of water either varies or starts and stops entirely, over a fairly regular time-scale of minutes or hours. Compared to continuously-flowing springs, rhythmic springs are uncommon, with the number worldwide estimated in 1991 to be around one hundred.

Theory 
Although the cause of the periodicity in flow is not known for certain, the most accepted theory (first postulated in the early 18th century) is that as groundwater flows continuously into a cavern, it fills a narrow tube that leads upwards from near the base of the cavern, then downwards to the spring. As the water level reaches the high point of the tube, it creates a siphon effect, sucking water out of the chamber. Eventually air rushes into the tube and breaks the siphon, stopping the flow if there is no other source feeding the spring, or reducing the flow if there is a continuous flow from another non-siphon source.

In 2006 the University of Utah studied the Intermittent Spring in Swift Creek canyon in Star Valley, Wyoming, United States. Kip Solomon, a hydrologist at the University concluded that "The spring water's gas content has now been tested [...]. The data strongly suggests the water was exposed to air underground; strong support for the siphon theory."

Notable rhythmic springs
The Intermittent Spring in Wyoming, mentioned above, is the largest rhythmic spring in the world.

The Gihon Spring in the City of David in Jerusalem used to be a rhythmic spring before modern-time overpumping affected the level of the underground water table. It was of great historical, archaeological, and cultural importance because it is what made possible the human settlement in ancient Jerusalem.

Pliny the Younger – who is famous for his accurate description of the Vesuvius eruption of AD 79 – also accurately described a rhythmic spring in the last letter of Book IV. This rhythmic spring is still acting to the same time scale today (Villa Pliniana spring in Como, Italy).

References

 
 
Ognjen Bonacci & Davor Bojanić, Rhythmic Karst Springs, Hydrological Sciences Journal, Feb 1991

External links 
 Zaganjalka spring
 (Russia, Tchelyabinsk area - in Russian)

Springs (hydrology)